20 is the 1992 retrospective two-CD box set by contemporary Christian music group 2nd Chapter of Acts. It consists of their catalog of music, plus live performances and early recordings.

Track listing

Disc 1
 "Jesus Is" – 2:24
 "Looking at God's Son" – 2:38
 "I'm So Happy" – 2:41
 "Which Way the Wind Blows" – 4:58
 "Easter Song" – 2:20
 "Last Day of My Life" – 3:08
 "Prince Song" – 2:51
 "Hey, Whatcha Say" – 3:28
 "Medley: Morning Comes When You Call\The Son Comes Over the Hill" – 5:31
 "Keep on Shining" – 3:27
 "Something Tells Me" – 3:39
 "Rod and Staff" – 2:55
 "Mansion Builder" – 3:02
 "Starlight, Starbright" – 3:00
 "Lightning Flash" – 2:45
 "Well, Haven't You Heard?" – 3:50
 "Are You Going to Narnia" – 3:26
 "Son of Adam Daughter of Eve" – 2:16
 "He's Broken Thru" – 2:41
 "Rejoice" – 3:00
 "Bread of Life" – 2:04
 "Nobody Can Take My Life" – 3:28
 "Heaven Came to Earth" – 2:15
 "Mountain Tops" – 2:54

Disc 2
 "I Fall In Love\Change" – 4:22
 "Room Noise" – 4:05
 "Takin' the Easy Way" – 4:02
 "Beware My Heart" – 4:30
 "Spin Your Light" – 3:26
 "No One Will Have A Secret" – 4:00
 "Night Light" – 3:29
 "That's Not Nice To Say" – 5:07
 "Heartstrings" – 3:37
 "He's the Light" – 4:04
 "Humble Yourself" – 3:57
 "Sing Over Me" – 4:05
 "Maybe Some Other Day" – 3:45
 "Take It to the World" – 3:03
 "You Are All In All" – 4:59
 "Just One Word" – 3:32
 "Star" – 4:07
source:

References

2nd Chapter of Acts albums
1992 compilation albums